Husby is a station on the blue line of the Stockholm metro, located in the district of Husby, northern Stockholm. The station was inaugurated on 5 June 1977 as part of the extension from Hallonbergen to Akalla.

Gallery

References

External links

Images of Husby

Blue line (Stockholm metro) stations
Railway stations opened in 1977
1977 establishments in Sweden